The 1982 United Airlines Tournament of Champions was a women's tennis tournament played on outdoor hard courts at the Grenelefe Golf & Tennis Resort in Haines City, Florida in the United States. It was part of the Toyota International Series circuit of the 1982 WTA Tour and classified as a Category 7 event. It was the third edition of the tournament and was held from April 26 through May 2, 1982. First-seeded Martina Navratilova won her third consecutive singles title at the event and earned $50,000 first-prize money.

Finals

Singles
 Martina Navratilova defeated  Wendy Turnbull 6–2, 7–5
It was Navratilova's 7th singles title of the year and the 62nd of her career.

Doubles
 Rosemary Casals /  Wendy Turnbull defeated  Kathy Jordan /  Anne Smith 6–3, 6–3

Prize money

Notes

References

External links
 ITF tournament edition details

United Airlines Tournament of Champions
United Airlines Tournament of Champions
1982 in sports in Florida
1982 in American tennis
April 1982 sports events in the United States
May 1982 sports events in the United States